Mitenyova Gora is a rural locality (a village) in Kichmegnskoye Rural Settlement, Kichmengsko-Gorodetsky District, Vologda Oblast, Russia. The population was 35 as of 2002.

Geography 
Mitenyova Gora is located 25 km northeast of Kichmengsky Gorodok (the district's administrative centre) by road. Alferovo is the nearest rural locality.

References 

Rural localities in Kichmengsko-Gorodetsky District